Nesrine Ben Kahia (born 18 July 1986) is a Tunisian table tennis player. She competed in the women's singles event at the 2004 Summer Olympics.

References

External links
 

1986 births
Living people
Tunisian female table tennis players
Olympic table tennis players of Tunisia
Table tennis players at the 2004 Summer Olympics
Place of birth missing (living people)
21st-century Tunisian women